Ram Chandra Prasad Singh (born 6 July 1958) is an Indian politician and former national president of Janata Dal (United). He is also a Member of Parliament, Rajya Sabha from Bihar from 2010 to 2022. He was a Uttar Pradesh cadre IAS officer before joining politics. He was also principal secretary of Nitish Kumar.He became Minister of Steel in Second Modi ministry when cabinet overhaul happened.

Personal life
Singh was born in Mustaffapur in Nalanda district, Bihar to Sukhdeo Narayan Singh and Dukhalalo Devi. He married Girija Singh on 21 May 1982, with whom he has two daughters. His daughter, Lipi Singh, is a 2016-batch IPS officer and second daughter Lata is a Lawyer. He belongs to OBC Kurmi caste.

Education 
He completed his primary education in his village and passed Twelfth grade from Patna Science College. He graduated with a Bachelor of Arts (Honours) degree in History from Patna College in 1979 and did Masters in International relations From School of International studies at Jawaharlal Nehru University, New Delhi in 1982.

Career
He initially joined the IRS (income tax) and completed the training. He resigned from the IRS after getting selected in the IAS in the year 1984, he was allotted the Uttar Pradesh cadre. He worked in various roles typical to an IAS officer both in state government and on central deputation.

While working in central deputation he came in contact with Nitish Kumar and worked as his private secretary for 7 years. He worked as Principal Secretary to Nitish Kumar after he was elected chief minister of Bihar in 2005 Bihar Legislative Assembly election. He took voluntary retirement from the Service in 2010 and joined the Nitish Kumar led JD(U) to start his political career.

Politics

 Got elected to Rajya Sabha in June 2010. 
 Served as Member of Standing Committee on Railway, DOPT, Home. 
 Served as Member of Consultative Committee on External Affairs and Home. 
 Joined JDU in 2010. Given the assignment of General Secretary. 
 Later elevated as General Secretary (Organisation) of JDU. 
 Served as National President JDU from 27 December 2020 to 31 July 2021.
 Took oath as Union Cabinet Minister of Steel, Govt. of India on 7 July 2021.

References 

|-

1958 births
Living people
People from Nalanda
Rajya Sabha members from Bihar
Indian Administrative Service officers
Janata Dal (United) politicians 
Narendra Modi ministry